Ad-Dummam is a village in Hamdan District of Sanaa Governorate, Yemen.

History 
According to Robert T.O. Wilson, ad-Dummam is "certainly" the same place as the "ad-Dumwam" mentioned several times by the 10th-century writer Abu Muhammad al-Hasan al-Hamdani in his Sifat Jazirat al-Arab.

References 

Villages in Sanaa Governorate